Made in America is a 1993 American comedy film starring Whoopi Goldberg and Ted Danson, and featuring Nia Long, Jennifer Tilly and Will Smith. The film was directed by Richard Benjamin. It was shot in various locations in Oakland, California, and at Oakland Technical High School.

"Colors of Love," written by Carole Bayer Sager, James Ingram and Bruce Roberts, and produced by David Foster is a notable song on the soundtrack which alludes to the story line.

Plot

Zora Matthews takes a blood test and discovers she has a blood group which is not a possible combination of the groups of her deceased father and her mother Sarah (Whoopi Goldberg). She confronts her mother and is told she used a sperm bank after her husband's death, but asked for a smart black guy.

Zora's curiosity gets the better of her and she gets her best friend Tea Cake (Will Smith) to go to the sperm bank and pretend to be a donor while she sneaks in to look at the records. Zora gets into the computer and the records show her mother was matched with a Halbert Jackson and gives his social security number.

In his luxury mansion, Hal finishes a night of lovemaking with his young girlfriend Stacy before setting off to work. As he reverses out of the garage, Zora gets in the way. She gets in his pickup truck and he goes to his work: Jackson's Motors. She is shocked that he is white. Hal is a flamboyant salesman of his own premises and is shooting an advert with a real bear. Zora interrupts and tells him he is her father. He does not behave well and shows no sympathy or empathy.

Her mom goes to confront Hal about how nasty he was. Zora and Tea Cake follow, but Tea Cake is diverted by the car saleswoman. Sarah and Hal are very different in every way. Hal plies her with drink and she cycles off in a drunken state. Hal drives her to her shop "African Queen" with the cycle in the back of the truck. The shop specializes in black authors. Upstairs is a shrine-like room with many pictures of Sarah growing up, plus a black man, Charles, which Sarah had been told was her father.

Back in his mansion Hal gets emotional in regard to a father-daughter scene in a film on TV: Shirley Temple in The Little Princess.

With his penchant for hiring wild animals Hal next hires an Indian elephant but while riding it, the elephant charges off through the streets, ending in a pond. It has been following the sound of the bell on Sarah's bike. Hal takes out his anger on her bike and rips the bell off. News coverage of Hal and the elephant accidentally gives free publicity to his dealership and he has a sales bonanza on the following day.

In apology, Hal later goes to her house with a present: a new bell plus a cycling helmet. He also has a present for Zora: an atlas to encourage her world travel. His assistant Diego arrives to take Zora on a date. This inspires Hal to ask Sarah out for dinner and they go for sushi. Hal isn't used to sushi and eats a whole ball of wasabi. Hal starts flirting heavily and they kiss goodnight. It gets more passionate but just as they get to the bedroom Zora and Diego get home. Zora is upset since she wanted to find her father but doesn't want her mom involved.

Both Hal and Sarah start thinking about each other. When Sarah goes to the dealership, they argue and Sarah cycles off in an emotional state. She gets hit by a car when she runs a red light. She is not wearing her new helmet and is badly injured. Hal and Zora go to the hospital and give blood. They sit by her bedside as she recovers.

Stacy breaks up with Hal because he was out all night.

When he goes back to the hospital a medic inadvertently reveals that a blood test shows that he cannot be Zora's father. Zora runs off. He apologises to Sarah.

Zora and Tea Cake graduate from school. Zora wins a Westinghouse scholarship to MIT. At her speech Zora gives her mother all the credit. Hal arrives. He wants to see his daughter graduate. He helps Sarah up the steps and Zora thanks her Mom and Dad.

Cast
 Whoopi Goldberg as Sarah Mathews
 Ted Danson as Hal Jackson
 Nia Long as Zora Mathews
 Will Smith as Tea Cake Walters
 Jennifer Tilly as Stacy
 Paul Rodriguez as Jose
 Peggy Rea as Alberta, Hal's elderly secretary
 Clyde Kusatsu as Bob Takashima
 David Bowe as Teddy
 Jeff Joseph as James
 Shawn Levy as Dwayne
 Rawley Valverde as Diego
 Charlene Fernetz as Paula the car saleswoman

Production

The story did not originally specify black actors for any of the roles and was rewritten upon Goldberg's casting.

Homage
The character of Hal Jackson is based in part on the real life car dealership owner Cal Worthington. Hal's use of large circus animals in his car commercials are an homage to Cal's famous "My Dog Spot" ads, which were also filmed with live circus animals.

Soundtrack
The soundtrack album was released on May 28, 1993.

 Gloria Estefan – "Go Away" (U.S. #103; UK #13)
 Keith Sweat and Silk – "Does He Do It Good"
 Del Tha Funkee Homosapien – "Made in America"
 Lisa Fischer – "Colors of Love" (U.S. AC #18, R&B #24)
 Sérgio Mendes – "What Is This?"
 Mark Isham – "Made In Love"
 Laura Satterfield and Ephraim Lewis – "I Know I Don't Walk on Water"
 DJ Jazzy Jeff and The Fresh Prince – "Dance or Die"
 Deep Purple – "Smoke on the Water"
 Ben E. King – "If You Need a Miracle"
 Y.T. Style – "Stand"

Reception
The film opened in theaters on May 28, 1993, and grossed over $12 million on its opening weekend. It was released to over 2,000 theaters and grossed nearly $50 million in the U.S. alone. Worldwide, it earned over $100 million. This was television star and Grammy Award-winning rapper Will Smith's second supporting role in a movie and started his successful career as a major film actor.

Made in America earned mostly negative reviews from critics, holding a 33% rating on Rotten Tomatoes based on 30 reviews. However, Roger Ebert praised Goldberg's acting in the film and said "This isn't a great movie, but it sure is a nice one."

References

External links 

1993 films
1990s American films
1990s English-language films
1993 comedy films
African-American comedy films
African-American films
Films about automobiles
Films about car dealerships
Films about interracial romance
Films about race and ethnicity
Films about sperm donation
Films directed by Richard Benjamin
Films produced by Arnon Milchan
Films produced by Michael Douglas
Films scored by Mark Isham
Films set in San Francisco
Regency Enterprises films
StudioCanal films